Mohale's Hoek Airport  is an airport serving the city of Mohale's Hoek, the capital of Mohale's Hoek District, Lesotho.

See also
Transport in Lesotho
List of airports in Lesotho

References

External links
 Lesotho Govt. Transport Sector Policy
 Mohale's Hoek Airport
 OurAirports - Lesotho

Airports in Lesotho
Mohale's Hoek